Novakane is the second studio album by American hip-hop group Outlawz, It was released on October 23, 2001, by Outlaw Recordz and Koch Records.

Track listing

Personnel

Charts

References

External links 
 

2001 albums
Outlawz albums
Albums produced by E.D.I.
Albums produced by Bosko
Albums produced by Mike Dean (record producer)
Albums produced by L.T. Hutton
E1 Music albums
Outlaw Recordz albums
Gangsta rap albums by American artists